Alemseged Efrem (born 19 November 1970) is an Eritrean football coach who is in charge of the Eritrea national football team as of 2015.

Eritrea

Despite being intransigent that his team were going to win opposing Botswana in a 2018 World Cup qualifying match, Efrem's side lost 2-0 and 3-1 to the Zebras;however, he and 10 players solicited political asylum in Botswana, claiming they were in danger by returning to their homeland but not elucidating why.

The Eritrean coach revealed that he was striving to select emerging young players and Eritrean expatriate footballers in Europe for the national roster in 2015.

References

External links
 Eritrean TV Interview

Living people
Eritrean footballers
Eritrean football managers
Eritrea international footballers
Eritrea national football team managers
Association football midfielders
1970 births